Each judge or courtroom in the United States have a law and motion calendar, setting aside the times when only motions and special legal arguments are heard.  These items consist of pretrial motions (such as a motion to compel relating to discovery requests) or other legal requests that are not connected to a trial, and do not include trials themselves.

See also
Legal case
Long cause
Short cause

References

Courts